Brettenham may refer to:

Places
Brettenham, Norfolk
Brettenham, Suffolk

Ships
, a Finnish cargo ship